John S. Middleton is an American businessperson and philanthropist. He is the managing partner and principal owner of the Philadelphia Phillies of Major League Baseball, holding a 48 percent ownership stake in the team.

Early life, education and family
The Middleton family descends from John Middleton, who, in 1857, founded John Middleton Co., a Philadelphia retail tobacco shop that evolved into a manufacturer and marketer of pipe tobacco and cigars.

Middleton graduated from the Haverford School in 1973. He was a wrestler at Amherst College from where he graduated magna cum laude in 1977 with his bachelor's degree in economics. He then attended Harvard Business School, graduating in 1979 with his Master of Business Administration.

Middleton is married to Leigh Middleton, and they have two children, Frances "Francie" Fields, and film and television producer John Powers Middleton.

Career
Middleton began working at his family's cigar business at age 16. After graduating from Harvard Business School, he returned home to work at John Middleton Inc. where his father put him on the company's board. Under Middleton, the company bought four tobacco brands from R.J. Reynolds in 1987, transforming the company into a major corporate interest in the pipe tobacco industry, and facilitating the subsequent growth of its packaged-cigar business.

In 2003, Middleton bought all shares in the family company from his mother and sisters, for about $200 million. In 2007, Middleton sold John Middleton Co. to Altria, the parent of Phillip Morris USA, for $2.9 billion. In 2015, litigation by his sister, Anna Nupson, supported by their sister, Lucia Hughes, disputing declared company assets of 2003, ensued. Through a mediator, the case was settled for $22 million in February 2018. Subsequently, Nupson filed a malpractice lawsuit, on July 15, 2020, with the U.S. District Court for the Eastern District of Pennsylvania, alleging ethical misconduct by Schnader Harrison Segal & Lewis and attorney Bruce A. Rosenfield, who had represented her in the suit against her brother.

Middleton is the president of Bradford Holdings, the parent company whose subsidiaries have included John Middleton Inc., Double Play Inc. (the corporate entity that holds his stake in the Phillies) and McIntosh Inns.

Philadelphia Phillies
Middleton bought a 15 percent stake in the Phillies for $18 million in 1994. He has been elected chairman of its partners’ Advisory Board annually since 1998.

When Phillies' chairman David Montgomery took a medical leave of absence in 2014, Middleton assumed a more active role, overseeing on-field and business performance, and increased his shareholding to 48 percent. In 2015, Middleton became the public face of the Phillies' ownership group. Middleton committed that the Phillies would have a greater focus on analytics, which influenced the hiring of Andy MacPhail as president, and Matt Klentak as general manager.

At the November 2016 MLB owners’ meeting, Middleton was elected the Phillies’ control person by the thirty clubs, making him the primary person accountable to the commissioner's office for the Phillies' operations and compliance with MLB rules.

Philanthropy
Middleton and his wife, Leigh, share philanthropic involvement in several organizations, including the Philadelphia Museum of Art, Penn Medicine, the Bryn Mawr Presbyterian Church, the Academy of Natural Sciences, and Project HOME.

In 2012, the Middletons announced a gift of more than $16.2 million to the Philadelphia School District, Philadelphia Youth Network, Philadelphia Academies and Drexel University for career and technical education.

In 2013, the Middletons pledged $30 million to Project HOME in an effort to end chronic homelessness by doubling the number of its apartments for homeless people, opening a new medical center and leveraging additional public and private funds.

The Middletons received the 2013 Philadelphia Award, in 2014, for their philanthropic works in the Philadelphia area, directed towards education, homelessness, and workforce development projects.

Middleton serves as a member of the board of trustees of Amherst College, which awarded him its Medal for Eminent Service in 2004, in recognition of his dedication to the college.

References

American billionaires
American sports businesspeople
Major League Baseball owners
Philadelphia Phillies executives
Philadelphia Phillies owners
Living people
Amherst College alumni
Harvard Business School alumni
People from Bryn Mawr, Pennsylvania
Haverford School alumni
Year of birth missing (living people)